Ellis Wynn (before 1559 – 27 September 1623) was an English politician.

He was appointed Gentleman harbinger by 1596 and a Clerk of the Petty Bag in Chancery in 1603.

He was a Member (MP) of the Parliament of England for Saltash in 1597.

References

16th-century births
1623 deaths
Members of the Parliament of England for Saltash
English MPs 1597–1598